Gordon Campbell (born 1948) is a retired Canadian diplomat and politician.

Gordon Campbell may also refer to:
 Gordon Campbell, Baron Campbell of Croy (1921–2005), British politician
 Gordon Campbell (cricketer) (1885–1961), Australian cricket player
 Gordon Campbell (Royal Navy officer) (1886–1953), recipient of the Victoria Cross and British politician
 Gordon Campbell (businessman), former Chief Executive and Chairman of Babcock International
 Gordon Peter Campbell (1898–1964), Canadian senator, lawyer and businessman
 Gordon Campbell, New Zealand journalist and editor of website Scoop
 Gordon A. Campbell, co-founder of Chips and Technologies
 Gordon Campbell (scholar) (born 1944), British Renaissance scholar
 Gordon Campbell (trombonist), principal trombonist with the BBC Big Band